The Bestune B70 is a mid-size sedan or Large family car produced by the Chinese car manufacturer Bestune FAW Group. 

The first generation B70 was developed with the Ford CD3 platform shared with the Mazda 6, and was produced from 2006 to 2014 with a mid-cycle facelift in 2012. The Second generation B70 was produced from 2014 to 2019 and was also built on the same platform as the Mazda 6 with an additional RS performance variant available with a Volkswagen-sourced turbo engine. the third generation B70 was produced from 2020.


First generation (2006–2014)

The first-generation B70 is technically based on the first generation of the Mazda6. The car was introduced in 2006 and the engine of this car was made by Mazda. was revised in 2012.

For the 2.0 L version, a six-speed manual transmission and a five-speed automatic are available, while the 2.3 L version is automatic only. The facelifted B70 ran on a 1.8 litre engine from FAW.

The security equipment is correspondingly much higher than the price of Chinese cars. Airbags for driver and front passenger are as standard as tire-pressure monitoring system, ABS and a traction control. For a surcharge there are numerous other airbags. Other equipment includes air conditioning as standard; for an extra charge, there are things like DVD player and navigation system.

An FCV variant was unveiled as a concept car on 15 April 2010.

2012 facelift
The first generation B70 received a facelift in 2012 significantly changing the design of the front grilles and rear end. An additional 1.8-litre engine with 102kW was added to the lineup, while the 2.0-litre engine producing  continues to be available. The 2.0-litre engine is  heavier than the 1.8-litre engine, and the top speed is claimed to be  for both variants. The facelifted B70 debuted at the 2011 Shanghai Auto Show in April 2011 alongside the facelifted B50 sedan.

Second generation (2014-2019)

The second generation Bestune B70 was launched onto the market in May 2014. It is based on the same platform as the second generation Mazda6. The engines of the second generation B70 includes a 108kW 2.0 liter (LF) engine and a 120kW 2.3 liter (L3) engine. The engine options were dropped in 2012 and replaced by an 1.8 liter (ET3) engine shared with the B50 developed by FAW.

The design of the second generation Bestune B70 was also done by Giorgetto Giugiaro.

B70 RS

Third generation (2020-present)

The third generation Bestune B70 is a 5-door liftback sedan that debuted during the 2020 Beijing Auto Show. The third generation Bestune B70 is the first car to be bult on FAW’s brand new FMA architecture. According to FAW, FMA stands for FAW Modular Architecture, while "F" also stands for both “Forward” and “Future”.

The third generation Bestune B70 sedan is equipped with a  1.5-litre turbo engine, and the engine pairs with either a six-speed automatic transmission or a six-speed manual transmission.

References

External links

 FAW Car Official site

Besturn vehicles
Sedans

Cars introduced in 2006
2010s cars
2020s cars